Tecnico may refer to:

 Instituto Superior Técnico, the faculty of engineering at the Technical University of Lisbon
 Club Deportivo Técnico Universitario, an Ecuadorian association football team
 A lucha libre term for a 'good guy' in wrestling; see face